This article lists the confirmed squads lists for 2006 Men's Hockey World Cup between September 6 to September 17, 2006.

Pool A

Argentina
Head coach: Sergio Vigil

Australia
Head coach: Barry Dancer

Japan
Head coach: Akira Takahashi

New Zealand
Head coach: Kevin Towns

Pakistan
Head coach: Nasir Ali

Spain
Head coach: Maurits Hendriks

Pool B

England
Head coach: Jason Lee

Germany
Head coach: Bernhard Peters

India
Head coach: Vasudevan Baskaran

Korea
Head coach: Cho Sang-Jun

Netherlands
Head coach: Roelant Oltmans

South Africa

External links
Official squad lists

squads
Men's Hockey World Cup squads